Following list compares main features of digital single-lens reflex cameras (DSLRs). Order of this list should be firstly by manufacturer alphabetically, secondly from high end to low end models. These are all DSLRs

Key:
 To save space, the "EOS" is left out from Canon model names.
 ISO values include maximum sensor range, even if in manual mode ("H1", "Hi 1", etc.)
 Continuous shooting: fps is "frames per second", indicates the highest speed for full resolution, without separate battery grip (i.e., not integrated into the body).
 Memory card types: CF is CompactFlash, SD is Secure Digital.
 Dimensions are rounded to the nearest whole number.
 Weight: with standard battery unless noted otherwise.

Timelines

References

 
Technological comparisons
Technology-related lists